Microchimica Acta is a monthly peer-reviewed scientific journal published by Springer Nature. It was established in 1937 by Fritz Pregl. The editors-in-chief are Alberto Escarpa (University of Alcalá) and Mamas I. Prodromidis (University of Ioannina), who succeeded Otto S. Wolfbeis (University of Regensburg). The journal covers research on (bio)chemical analytical methods based on the use of micro- and nanomaterials. According to the Journal Citation Reports, the journal has a 2019 impact factor of 6.232.

References

External links

Springer Science+Business Media academic journals
Chemistry journals
Monthly journals
Publications established in 1937
English-language journals